Chinhoyi, originally known as Sinoia, is a city in central northern Zimbabwe  in the Makonde District. It has a population of 90,800 and is primarily a college town, although it was originally founded as an Italian group settlement scheme. The nearby Chinhoyi Caves and national park are a popular attraction.

Location
Chinhoyi is located on the western banks of the Manyame River, in Makonde District, in Mashonaland West Province in central northern Zimbabwe.

The geographical coordinates of Chinhoyi are:17°20'59.0"S, 30°11'40.0"E (Latitude:-17.349722; Longitude:30.194444).

There are a number of small towns which are close to Chinhoyi.

Overview
Chinhoyi is the provincial capital of Mashonaland West Province, one of the ten administrative provinces in Zimbabwe. It is also the district headquarters of Makonde District, one of the six districts in the province.

This is a college town, hosting two of the country's major universities; Chinhoyi University of Technology (CUT) and Zimbabwe Open University (ZOU). The principal secondary schools in Chinhoyi include the three government high schools; Chinhoyi High School, Chemagamba High School and Nemakonde High School, together with the private high school Lomagundi College.

Chinhoyi houses Chinhoyi Provincial Hospital, the largest and most modern referral hospital in Mashonaland West Province. Tourist attractions in Chinhoyi include the Chinhoyi Caves in Chinhoyi Caves National Park.

History

The town was established as Sinoia in 1906, as a group settlement scheme by a wealthy Italian, Lieutenant Margherito Guidotti. He encouraged ten Italian families to settle here. The Second Chimurenga War (War of Liberation) started in this town in the area occupied by the Chinhoyi Provincial Hospital. The name Sinoria derives from Tjinoyi, a Lozwi/Rozwi Chief who is believed to have been a son of Lukuluba (corrupted to Mukuruva by the Zezuru), who was the third son of Emperor Netjasike. The Kalanga (Lozwi/Rozwi name) was changed to Sinoia by the white settlers and later Chinhoyi by the Zezuru.

Transport
Transport to and from Chinhoyi is mainly by road. Bus services connect Chinhoyi with Harare, Karoi, Kariba, Mhangura, Bulawayo, and smaller villages in the district. Chinhoyi is on a rail branch from Harare, which ends at Lions Den. There are scheduled passenger trains. Taxis operate within the town area. There is also a local bus service. The airport is said to be in need of maintenance. Its geographical coordinates are quoted as:17°25'58.8"S, 30°18'00.0"E (Latitude:-17.433000; Longitude:30.300000).

Economy
Chinhoyi's economy is a tertiary industry meaning that it is mainly a service industry based economy. It consists of retailing, financial services, wholesaling, and provincial government services since the city is the provincial capital. Education and the construction industry influence the economy of the city. The presence of Chinhoyi University of Technology and the construction of new houses contribute to the town's economy. The city also provides many services to the surrounding small towns like Banket, Kasimure, Mutorashanga, as well as to the whole of the Makonde district.

Financial services

First Capital Bank Zimbabwe Limited, a commercial bank, maintains a branch in the town. ZB Bank Limited, sometimes referred to as Zimbank, another commercial bank, also has a branch in Chinhoyi. CBZ Bank Limited is also another bank with a branch in Chinhoyi. There are also BancABC, NMB bank NBS bank, CABS, Agribank and Steward bank agents.

Population
The population of Chinhoyi during the 2002 census was 56,794. After the 2012 national census, the city population was estimated at 77,292 people. At that time it was the 11th largest urban centre in Zimbabwe.

Recreational sites

Chinhoyi Caves

These are a group of limestone and dolomite caves situated about 9 kilometers northwest of Chinhoyi along the A-1 Highway. The main cave contains a pool of cobalt blue water, which is popularly called Sleeping Pool or Chirorodziva ("Pool of the Fallen"). They have been designated as a national park and they are managed by the Zimbabwe Parks & Wildlife Management Authority. These limestone caves were first described to Europeans by Frederick Courtney Selous in 1887, but the caves have an important place in African traditional religion, with the caves themselves as a site for rainmaking, surrounded by a sacred forest, whose trees could not be felled.

See also
 Railway stations in Zimbabwe
 Districts of Zimbabwe
 Provinces of Zimbabwe
 Economy of Zimbabwe

References

External links
 Chinhoyi Hospital begins PCR tests As at 21 May 2020.

 
Makonde District
Mashonaland West Province
Populated places in Zimbabwe